KKNM (96.5 FM) is a radio station licensed to serve Bovina, Texas. It broadcasts to the greater Clovis, New Mexico area, airing an oldies format branded "FM 96.5 Good Time Oldies". The station is currently owned by HPRN Networks, LLP.

References

External links

KNM
Classic country radio stations in the United States
Radio stations established in 2008
2008 establishments in Texas
Parmer County, Texas